John Thomas Finnie (September 14, 1847 – February 10, 1925) was a Canadian physician and politician.

Born in Peterhead, Scotland, Finnie was educated there and at the High School of Montreal, then at McGill College. He qualified as a doctor and was admitted to the Royal College of Surgeons of Edinburgh. He married Amelia Ann Healy, a daughter of Christopher Healy.

Finnie was elected to the Legislative Assembly of Quebec for Montréal division no. 4 in 1908. A Liberal, he was re-elected for the riding of Montréal–Saint-Laurent in 1912 and 1916. He resigned in 1918 when he became Collector of Provincial Revenue for the District of Montreal.

He died in Montreal in 1925.

References

1847 births
1925 deaths
High School of Montreal alumni
People from Peterhead
Quebec Liberal Party MNAs
Scottish emigrants to pre-Confederation Quebec
19th-century Canadian physicians
20th-century Canadian physicians
Immigrants to the Province of Canada
Anglophone Quebec people